The 2008 congressional elections in Tennessee was held on November 4, 2008, to determine who will represent the state of Tennessee in the United States House of Representatives. Tennessee has nine seats in the House, apportioned according to the 2000 United States Census. Representatives are elected for two-year terms; the elected served in the 111th Congress from January 4, 2009, until January 3, 2011. In the 2008 elections, Tennessee elected 5 Democrats and 4 Republicans to the US House, as neither the Democratic nor the Republican Party gained any seats. The election coincided with the 2008 U.S. presidential election.

Overview

District 1

This district covers northeast Tennessee, including all of Carter, Cocke, Greene, Hamblen, Hancock, Hawkins, Johnson, Sullivan, Unicoi, and Washington counties and parts of Jefferson County and Sevier County. It has been represented by Republican David Davis since 2007.

Johnson City mayor Roe narrowly defeated Davis in the Republican primary by a margin of 50% to 49% (only 500 votes). Davis was elected in 2006, succeeding retiring congressman Bill Jenkins, winning the Republican nomination over a crowded field which included Roe. Roe, a retired OB/GYN, was endorsed by several local newspapers, refused PAC and special interest money, and promised not to serve any more than ten years in Congress. He was a shoo-in for election in a district that has only elected Republicans since 1880.

District 2

This district lies in the east-central part of the state, based in Knoxville, and is largely coextensive with that city's metropolitan area. It has been represented by Republican Jimmy Duncan since November 1988. He ran against Democrat Bob Scott. No Democrat has held this seat since 1855.  CQ Politics forecasted the race as 'Safe Republican'.

District 3

This district has been represented by Republican Zach Wamp since 1995. His Democratic opponent was Doug Vandagriff. CQ Politics forecasted the race as 'Safe Republican'.

District 4

This district lies in Middle and East Tennessee and includes all of Bledsoe, Campbell, Coffee, Cumberland, Fentress, Franklin, Giles, Grundy, Lawrence, Lewis, Lincoln, Marion, Maury, Moore, Morgan, Pickett, Scott, Sequatchie, Van Buren, Warren, and White Counties, as well as portions of Hickman, Roane, and Williamson counties. It has been represented by Democrat Lincoln Davis since 2003. He ran against Republican Monty Lankford.  Although the 4th is one of the few districts in the nation that is not considered safe for either party, its size and the fact it includes five television markets make it fairly easy for incumbents to tenure themselves in.  CQ Politics forecasted the race as 'Safe Democrat'.

District 5

This district lies in Middle Tennessee, including almost all of Davidson County, half of Wilson County, and half of Cheatham County. Nearly two-thirds of the district's voting population lives in Nashville. It has been represented by Democrat Jim Cooper since 2003. He ran against Republican Gerard Donovan. CQ Politics forecasted the race as 'Safe Democrat'.

District 6

This district lies in Middle Tennessee, including all of Bedford, Cannon, Clay, DeKalb, Jackson, Macon, Marshall, Overton, Putnam, Robertson, Rutherford, Smith, Sumner, and Trousdale Counties, as well as a portion of Wilson County. It has been represented by Democrat Bart Gordon since 1985. He ran against independent candidate Chris Baker. CQ Politics forecasted the race as 'Safe Democrat'.

District 7

This district lies in Middle and southwestern Tennessee, connecting suburbs of Memphis and Nashville. It has been represented by Republican Marsha Blackburn since 2003. She ran against Democrat Randy G. Morris. CQ Politics forecasted the race as 'Safe Republican'.

District 8

This district covers roughly the northwestern part of the state. It has been represented by Democrat John S. Tanner since 1989. He ran unopposed by any party candidates and encountered opposition from only a few write-in votes. CQ Politics forecasted the race as 'Safe Democrat'.

District 9

This district lies in southwestern Tennessee, located entirely within Shelby County and including most of the city of Memphis. It has been represented by Democrat Steve Cohen since 2007, who ran against independent candidates Jake Ford, Dewey Clark, and Taylor Shelby Wright. CQ Politics forecasts the race as 'Safe Democrat'.

Cohen defeated attorney Nikki Tinker by a 79% to 19% margin in the Democratic primary. Cohen, who is the only white congressman representing a majority black district, defeated Tinker, who is black, by a much narrower margin in 2006. There was much controversy over accusations made by the Tinker campaign that Cohen was involved with the Ku Klux Klan, and circulation of anti-Semitic propaganda against Cohen, who is Jewish. No Republican filed in this overwhelmingly Democratic district, although Cohen's primary victory assured him of a second term in any case.

References

External links
Division of Elections from the Tennessee Secretary of State
U.S. Congress candidates for Tennessee at Project Vote Smart
Tennessee U.S. House Races from 2008 Race Tracker
Campaign contributions for Tennessee congressional races from OpenSecrets

2008
Tennessee
United States House of Representatives